Ecco i miei gioielli is a compilation album by the Italian punk rock band CCCP Fedeli alla linea released in 1992.

Track listing 

 "And the radio plays"
 "Inch'Allah - ça va" (alt. version - sung by Giovanni Ferretti)
 "Curami" (remix)
 "A ja ljublju SSSR"
 "Trafitto" (remix)
 "Tu menti"
 "Annarella"
 "Noia" (live in Baveno, 1989
 "Svegliami (Perizia Psichiatrica Nazionalpopolare)"
 "Amandoti"
 "Le qualità della danza"
 "Palestina (15/11/1988)"
 "È vero"
 "Rozzemilia"

Personnel 

 Annarella Giudici - Benemerita soubrette, vocals
 Giovanni Lindo Ferretti - vocals
 Ignazio Orlando - bass, keyboards, drums
 Carlo Chiapparini - guitar
 Massimo Zamboni - guitar
 Danilo Fatur - Artista del popolo, vocals
 Silvia Bonvicini -, vocals
 Umberto Negri - bass (1982-1985)

See also
 CCCP discography
 Consorzio Suonatori Indipendenti (C.S.I.)
 Per Grazia Ricevuta (PGR)
 Punk rock

References and footnotes

CCCP Fedeli alla linea albums
1992 compilation albums
Virgin Records compilation albums
Italian-language albums